

James Yimm Lee (January 31, 1920 – December 30, 1972) was an American martial arts pioneer, teacher, author, and publisher. James Lee is known for being a mentor, teacher and friend of Bruce Lee.

Early life
Lee was born on January 31, 1920, in Oakland, California. He was a welder by profession. He joined the United States Army in August 1944. After basic training, he was stationed at Fort Knox, Kentucky for radio operator school. In January 1945, he was deployed to the Philippine Islands for about a year while part of the 716th Tank Battalion and fought in the Luzon and Mindanao campaigns. In January 1946, he was sent to the Letterman Army Hospital, San Francisco, California due to recurring bouts of Malaria. He became a private first class and was assigned to 801st Military Police Battalion in San Francisco, California.

Career
He was one of Bruce Lee's (no relation) three personally certified 3rd rank instructors and co-founded the Jun Fan Gung Fu Institute in Oakland where he taught Jun Fan Gung Fu in Bruce's absence. James was responsible for introducing Bruce Lee to Ed Parker, the organizer of the Long Beach International Karate Championships where Bruce was first introduced to the martial arts community.

James Lee became well known for his Iron Palm specialty, and would routinely break bricks at demonstrations. He was the first to publish an Iron Palm book in America in 1957.

He and Linda Lee were eyewitnesses of the fight between Bruce Lee and Wong Jack-man held privately at Chinatown, Oakland in 1964.

Books
Lee was a well-established author and was one of the first to publish martial arts books in English in America. He also helped Bruce Lee publish his first book, "Chinese Gung-Fu: The Philosophical Art of Self Defense." James Lee's published books include: Modern Kung-Fu Karate: Iron Poison Hand Training, Book 1 (Break Brick in 100 Days), Wing Chun Kung-Fu , and Secret Fighting Arts of the Orient.

Personal life
Lee married Katherine Margaret Chow on October 13, 1951, in Nevada, they had at least two children, a daughter Karena Lee and a son Greglon Yimm Lee.

Jesse Glover was introduced to Chinese Kung Fu by James Lee during a trip before meeting Bruce Lee in 1959.

His wife Katherine died in 1964.

Death
James Lee died aged 52 on 30 December 1972 due to lung cancer caused by welding fumes, only about 7 months before the death of Bruce Lee.

Notable students
Robert Baker
Howard Williams
Gene Snelling
Al Novak
Gary Dill

See also
Chinese Martial Arts
Bruce Lee
Oakland
Jeet Kune Do
Wing Chun

References

External links
In Memory of James Yimm Lee
James Yimm Lee biography 
Karate, make that Kung Fu
The West Learns About The 'Empty Hand'
(Wayback Machine copy)

1920 births
1972 deaths
American martial arts writers
Sportspeople from Oakland, California
Writers from Oakland, California
20th-century American non-fiction writers
Sportswriters from California
Deaths from lung cancer in California
United States Army soldiers
United States Army personnel of World War II